Zollino (Griko: , translit. ;) is a small town and comune of 2,194 inhabitants in the province of Lecce in Apulia, Italy. It is one of the nine towns of Grecìa Salentina, which still keeps Greek language and traditions.

History
Zollino's territory was settled in pre-historic times, as attested by the presence of dolmens and menhirs in the area. Its foundation origin is not clear: it could be an Iapygian colony from the nearby Apigliano, or a rural offshoot of Soleto. In historical ancient times it was an important trade centre between the Ionian and the Adriatic coasts.

In the Middle Ages, it belonged to the county of Lecce founded by the Hauteville Normands. In 1190 king Tancred of Sicily donated it to Berlinghiero Chiaromonte. After belonging to the Principality of Taranto, in 1463 it became a possession of Raimondello Orsini del Balzo. Afterwards the latter's death Zollino was again a direct royal possession and, later, a fief of the Granafei marquisses of Sternatia.

Main sights
 Mother Church of Saints Peter and Paul
 Menhir S. Anna
 Menhir "Stazione"
 Dolmen "Cranzari"
 The hypogeum oil mill
 Church of S. Anna
 Pozzelle
 Church of Saint Joseph
 Statue of Martin Zoleno
 Church of Madonna of Loreto

Transportation

Zollino has a station on the Lecce-Gallipoli and Zollino-Gagliano del Capo railroads, served by the Ferrovie del Sud Est.

By road, it can be reached through the Lecce-Maglie SS16 Adriatica state road.

References

Grecìa Salentina
Localities of Salento